Z Filmtidsskrift is a Norwegian film magazine, which was started in 1983. The magazine is owned and published by the Norwegian Federation of Film Societies. It is published on a quarterly basis and is based in Oslo. As of 2014 Ingrid Rommetveit was the editor of the magazine.

See also
 List of film periodicals

References

External links

1983 establishments in Norway
Film magazines
Magazines established in 1983
Magazines published in Oslo
Norwegian-language magazines
Quarterly magazines published in Norway